Mode I may refer to:
 Oldowan or Mode I, archaeological culture's method of fabricating flint tools
 Mode I crack or opening mode of propagation of a fracture